The Golden Plague (German: Die goldene Pest) may refer to:

 The Golden Plague (1921 film), a German silent film directed by Richard Oswald
 The Golden Plague (1954 film), a West German film directed by John Brahm